The moustached flowerpiercer (Diglossa mystacalis) is a species of bird in the family Thraupidae. It was first described by French ornithologist Frédéric de Lafresnaye in 1846. It is found in Bolivia and Peru. Its natural habitats are subtropical or tropical moist montane forests, subtropical or tropical high-altitude grassland, and heavily degraded former forest.

References

moustached flowerpiercer
Birds of the Bolivian Andes
Birds of the Peruvian Andes
moustached flowerpiercer
Taxonomy articles created by Polbot